Chloroclystis actephilae is a moth in the  family Geometridae. It is found in southern India.

References

Moths described in 1958
acetephilae
Moths of Asia